Maksim Romanovich Borisko (born 15 February 2000) is a Russian football player. He plays for FC Baltika Kaliningrad.

Club career
He made his debut in the Russian Professional Football League for FC Kuban-2 Krasnodar on 20 March 2017 in a game against FC Chernomorets Novorossiysk.

He made his Russian Football National League debut for FC Baltika Kaliningrad on 28 July 2019 in a game against FC Chertanovo Moscow.

References

External links
 Profile by Russian Professional Football League

2000 births
Sportspeople from Krasnodar
Living people
Russian footballers
Russia youth international footballers
Russia under-21 international footballers
Association football goalkeepers
FC Kuban Krasnodar players
FC Urozhay Krasnodar players
FC Baltika Kaliningrad players
Russian First League players
Russian Second League players